The Dutch East Indies campaign of 1941–1942 was the conquest of the Dutch East Indies (present-day Indonesia) by forces from the Empire of Japan in the early days of the Pacific campaign of World War II. Forces from the Allies attempted unsuccessfully to defend the islands. The East Indies were targeted by the Japanese for their rich oil resources which would become a vital asset during the war. The campaign and subsequent three and a half year Japanese occupation was also a major factor in the end of Dutch colonial rule in the region.

Background
The East Indies was one of Japan's primary targets if and when it went to war because the colony possessed abundant valuable resources, the most important of which were its rubber plantations and oil fields; the colony was the fourth-largest exporter of oil in the world, behind the U.S., Iran, and Romania. The oil made the islands enormously important to the Japanese, so they sought to secure the supply for themselves.

Access to oil was the main goal of the Japanese war effort, as Japan has no native source of oil; it could not even produce enough to meet even 10% of its needs, even with the extraction of oil shale in Manchuria using the Fushun process. Japan quickly lost 93 percent of its oil supply after President Franklin D. Roosevelt issued an executive order on 26 July 1941 which froze all of Japan's U.S. assets and embargoed all oil exports to Japan. In addition, the Dutch government in exile, at the urging of the Allies and with the support of Queen Wilhelmina, broke its economic treaty with Japan and joined the embargo in August. Japan's military and economic reserves included only a year and a half's worth of oil. As a U.S. declaration of war against Japan was feared if the latter took the East Indies, the Japanese planned to eliminate the U.S. Pacific Fleet, allowing them to take over the islands; this led to the attack on Pearl Harbor.

Declaration of war
In late November, the Netherlands government in the East Indies under the Dutch government-in-exile (already at war with Imperial Japan's Axis power ally Germany in Europe) began preparing for war against Japan itself: ships of the Royal Netherlands Navy were sent to sea and the KNIL Air Force was mobilised. On 4 December, three days after having decided on a policy of war against America, Britain and the Netherlands, the Japanese government decided instead to "treat the Netherlands as a quasi enemy until actual hostilities ... occur." This was in the hope that the Dutch would not preemptively destroy oil installations before the Japanese were ready to invade. On 8 December 1941, in a public proclamation, the Netherlands declared war on Japan. By 7:00 a.m. on the day of the attack, the East Indies government had warned merchantmen at sea to make for the nearest port. At that hour, the governor general made a public announcement over the radio that the Netherlands "accepts the challenge and takes up arms against the Japanese Empire." Instructions had been telegraphed to the embassy in Tokyo at 2:30 a.m., even before news of the attack on Pearl Harbor had reached the Dutch government in London at 4:00. The instructions were only received on the evening of the next day, and the declaration of war was finally handed to the Japanese foreign minister, Shigenori Tōgō, by the Dutch ambassador, J. C. Pabst, on the morning of 10 December. The Swedish ambassador agreed to handle Dutch interests for the duration of the conflict.

The Dutch declaration did not alter the Japanese decision, and the latter's declaration of war did not come until 11 January 1942. When Japan was charged with waging a "war of aggression" before the International Military Tribunal for the Far East in 1946, it was argued that her attitude towards the Netherlands proved otherwise, since the Dutch had declared war first. The tribunal rejected this, on the grounds that Japan's sole intention was "to give less time to the Netherlands for destroying oil wells." They found that the Netherlands' declaration was in self-defence.

Campaign
General Hisaichi Terauchi, commander of the Southern Expeditionary Army Group, began the campaign by sending the 16th Army under command of General Hitoshi Imamura to attack Borneo. On 17 December, Japanese forces successfully landed on Miri, an oil production centre in northern Sarawak, with support from a battleship, an aircraft carrier, three cruisers and four destroyers.

Initially, the Japanese forces launched air strikes on key areas and gained air superiority. Following the airstrikes, landings were made at several locations targeting airfields and other important points in the area. In addition to the landings at Miri, the Japanese forces made landings at Seria, Kuching, Jesselton and Sandakan between 15 December 1941 and 19 January 1942. After these main objectives in Borneo were completed, the Japanese forces planned a three-pronged assault southward using three forces named Eastern Force, Center Force and Western Force. The aim of this assault was to capture the oil resources in the East Indies. The Eastern Force was to advance from Jolo and Davao and move on to capture Celebes, Amboina and Timor, while protecting the Center Force's flank. The Center Force was to capture oil fields and airfields in Tarakan Island and Balikpapan. Both these forces would support the Western Force, which was to attack and capture the oil refineries and airfields in Palembang. The Japanese forces launched the assault on 11 January and landed at Tarakan.

To coordinate the fight against the Japanese, the American, British, Dutch, and Australian forces combined all available land and sea forces under the American-British-Dutch-Australian Command (ABDACOM or ABDA) banner. This command was activated on 15 January 1942, with the overall commander being British Field Marshal Sir Archibald Wavell. The command structure had the American Army Air Force Lieutenant General George Brett as deputy commander, the British Lieutenant General Henry Royds Pownall as chief of staff; under them were the American Admiral Thomas C. Hart as naval commander, the Dutch Lieutenant General Hein ter Poorten as ground forces commander, and the British Air Chief Marshal Sir Richard Peirse as the air commander. Although the forces were combined, they had differing priorities: the British believed the defense of the territory of Singapore and the eastern entrances to the Indian Ocean (the route to British Ceylon and British India) to be paramount, the Americans and Australians did not want a total penetration of Southeast Asia that would deprive them of bases necessary for any serious counterattack, and the Dutch considered Java and Sumatra, their "second homeland where [they] had been trading and living for over three centuries", to be the most important place to defend.

Even the combined forces could not stop or even slow the Japanese advance due to their much greater numbers; to face the Japanese attacking naval forces, the ABDA command had a conglomerate of ships drawn from any available units, which included the U.S. Asiatic Fleet (fresh from the fall of the Philippines), a few British and Australian surface ships, and Dutch units that had previously been stationed in the East Indies. Being based on Java, these ships had to take on the central and western prongs of the three-headed Japanese assault. The central force's combat ships included the light carrier , the seaplane tenders  and Sanuki Maru, three light cruisers, and 16 destroyers, while the western force contained five heavy cruisers and seven destroyers. In addition, four Japanese fleet carriers (and ) and the four  battleships were in the theater of operation.

The Japanese forces were using Tarakan airfield as a forward airbase by 17 January, and Balikpapan was also captured a week later. However, the Dutch garrisons had destroyed the oil fields before they were captured by the Japanese in both cases. Several Japanese vessels were destroyed or damaged due to naval and air counterattacks from the Allied forces, but the defending Dutch battalions were overrun by the Japanese forces. By 28 January, the Japanese had taken control of the airfields at Balikpapan, and their aircraft were operating from them. By the end of January, Japanese forces had captured parts of the Celebes and Dutch Borneo. By February, Japanese forces had landed on Sumatra and encouraged a revolt in Aceh.

Most of the naval components of the allied force were crushed in the battles of Java Sea, Sunda Strait and Second Java Sea; the only American ship larger than a destroyer to survive the battles was the old cruiser Marblehead. In addition, the land forces on the islands were quickly overwhelmed and most major resistance was overcome within two months of the initial assaults, although a guerrilla campaign in Timor was successfully waged for a time. The ABDA command was dissolved at about 01:00 on 1 March, less than two months after its inception, by Admiral Conrad Emil Lambert Helfrich.

Surrender
On 8 March, Dutch surrendered without condition to Japan in Kalijati, Subang, West Java. This is also known as Kalijati treaty. On 9 March, the Dutch Commander-in-Chief of Allied forces on Java, Lt. Gen. Ter Poorten surrendered along with Governor General Jonkheer A.W.L. Tjarda van Starkenborgh Stachouwer. Ter Poorten's surrender announcement was made without consulting the commanders of the British and US forces, which wanted to continued fighting, but which had no choice but to comply with the surrender.

Aftermath

Allied forces did not attempt to retake the islands of Java, Sumatra, Timor, or Bali during the war. Japanese forces on those islands surrendered at the conclusion of World War II. Most of the Japanese military personnel and civilian colonial administrators were repatriated to Japan following the war, except for several hundred who were detained for investigations of war crimes, for which some were later put on trial. About 1,000 Japanese soldiers deserted from their units and assimilated into local communities. Many of these soldiers provided assistance to Indonesian Republican forces during the Indonesian National Revolution.

Battles of the campaign

 Battle of Borneo (1941–42)
 Battle of Manado (1942)
 Battle of Tarakan (1942)
 Battle of Balikpapan (1942)
 Battle of Kendari (1942)
 Battle of Samarinda (1942)
 Battle of Banjarmasin (1942)
 Battle of Ambon (1942)
 Battle of Palembang (1942)
 Battle of Makassar Strait
 Battle of Badung Strait (1942)
 Battle of the Java Sea (1942)
 Second Battle of the Java Sea (1942)
 Battle of Sunda Strait (1942)
 Battle of Java (1942)
 Battle of Timor (1942–43)

Notes

References

Further reading
 
 
 
 
 
 
 
 
 
 
 

Conflicts in 1941
Conflicts in 1942
Pacific theatre of World War II
Dutch East Indies, 1941-42
Japanese occupation of the Dutch East Indies
1941 in the Dutch East Indies
1942 in the Dutch East Indies
Campaigns of World War II
Campaigns, operations and battles of World War II involving the United Kingdom
Amphibious operations of World War II